The 4th Cavalry Corps was a cavalry corps in the Imperial Russian Army.

Part of
4th Army: 1915
8th Army: 1915–1916
8th Army: 1916
3rd Army: 1917
Russian Special Army: 1917

Commanders
Lieutenant General J. F. von Gillenschmidt: 1915

References
 A. K. Zalesskij I mirowaja wojna. Prawitieli i wojennaczalniki. wyd. WECZE Moskwa 2000.

Corps of the Russian Empire